Rajesaba Maktumasab Yankanchi (also known as Raju Talikote) is an Indian actor and comedian. He was one of the participants in Bigg Boss Kannada (season 7).

Selected filmography

Punjabi House (2002)
Manasaare (2009)
Pancharangi (2010)
Sugreeva (2010)
Appu and Pappu (2010)
Mallikarjuna (2011)
Lifeu Ishtene (2011)
Rajadhani (2011)
Alemari (2012)
Myna (2013)
Topiwala (2013)
Veera (2013)
U The End A (2016)
100 (2021)

See also
List of people from Karnataka
Kannada cinema
List of Indian film actresses
Cinema of India

References

External links

Male actors in Kannada cinema
Indian male film actors
Male actors from Karnataka
21st-century Indian male actors
Living people
Year of birth missing (living people)